Epipremnum silvaticum is a flowering plant belonging to the genus Epipremnum, and the family Araceae. It is a perennial evergreen vine.

It has a liana growth style.

It can be found in Sumatra.

It climbs via aerial roots and grows up to 6 meters (~19 feet). The adult plant's stem has a thickness of  5–10 mm with internodes 0.5–2 centimeters long.

References 

silvaticum